There have been 121 women in the Australian Senate since the establishment of the Parliament of Australia. Women have had the right to stand for federal parliament since 1902, and there were three female candidates for the Senate at the 1903 federal election (Vida Goldstein, Nellie Martel, and Mary Moore-Bentley). However, it was not until Dorothy Tangney's victory at the 1943 federal election that a woman was elected. Since then, all states and territories have had multiple female senators – in chronological order: Western Australia (1943), Queensland (1947), Victoria (1950), South Australia (1955), Tasmania (1975), the Australian Capital Territory (1975), New South Wales (1987), and the Northern Territory (1998).

History

The passage of the Commonwealth Franchise Act allowed women to both vote and stand for election to the Parliament of Australia. Three women stood unsuccessfully as independents or as representatives of minor parties for election to the Senate for the 1903 election. Nellie Martel and Mary Ann Moore-Bentley of New South Wales ran, each earning around 18,000 votes, with the leading man winning roughly 190,000 votes. Vida Goldstein, from Victoria, ran and gained 51,497 votes, which was roughly half the votes the winning man gained. She then ran unsuccessfully again in 1910 and 1917 after a short stint attempting to breakthrough into the House of Representatives.  In 1919, Mary McMahon of NSW ran unsuccessfully, and was not followed by another woman candidate until 1934 saw Lillie Beirne (NSW) and Joanna Helbach (QLD) run. Following this, Jeanne Young of Western Australia ran in 1937 and Adela Walsh (NSW) and Dorothy Tangney (WA) ran in 1940. However, women were not successful in entering federal politics until World War II.  The major parties did not endorse any female candidates for the Senate before the War.

The first woman to be elected to the Senate was  representative Dorothy Tangney in 1943; she represented Western Australia. Following Tangney's entry into politics, the Senate has continuously had women members. However, despite the success, the number of women running continued to fluctuate drastically. Prior to 1981, the proportion of women running as candidates peaked at 20% in 1977 but had a low of only 1.3% in 1953. Between the years 1943 and 1969, there were only five elections of women and Enid Lyons accounted for three of these in the House of Representatives. Despite this, 41 women were elected into the Senate between 1943 and 1980. The proportion of women in the Senate can be seen over a long time period to have drastically grown, with the 1948 Senate being composed of 5.6% women, 14.1% in 1980, 23.7% in 1990, 28.9% in 2002, and 53% in 2021.

The second woman elected to the Senate, Annabelle Rankin, also achieved a number of firsts for women: she was the first female Whip, and she was the first woman with a federal portfolio when she became Minister for Housing in 1966. In 1975, Margaret Guilfoyle became the first female cabinet minister with a portfolio.  In 1996 Margaret Reid was the first woman elected as President of the Senate.

Women in the Senate have made significant changes to Australian law which have benefited women. For example, a private member's bill written by Senator Susan Ryan was crucial to the development of the Sex Discrimination Act 1984, the Affirmative Action (Equal Employment Opportunity for Women) Act 1986, the Public Service Reform Act 1984 and the Equal Employment Opportunity (Commonwealth Authorities) Act 1987.

With the appointment of Sarah Henderson to the Senate on 11 September 2019, the number of women in the chamber was equal to the number of men for the first time in history. With the resignation of Richard Di Natale and the appointment of Lidia Thorpe on 4 September 2020, the number of women (39) exceeded the number of men (37) for the first time.

List of women in the Australian Senate
Names in bold type indicate Ministers and Parliamentary Secretaries.
Names in italics indicate appointments made under section 15 of the Constitution, or through disqualification.  Names marked with an asterisk (*) also served in the House of Representatives. Where no closing date is shown, the Senator's term of service is unexpired.

Timeline

Proportion of women in the Senate
Numbers and proportions are as they were directly after the beginning of Senate terms and do not take into account deaths, resignations, appointments, defections or other changes in membership. As senators typically serve six-year terms, in the absence of a double dissolution, the numbers of female senators overlap two "terms". State-based Coalition parties that caucus with one of the major parties (Liberal National Party, Country Liberal Party) have been included in the Liberals' or Nationals' totals.

See also
Women and government in Australia
Women in the Australian House of Representatives

Notes

References

Senators
Women, Senate

Women